Water extraction (or water withdrawal) is the process of taking water from any source, either temporarily or permanently, for flood control or to obtain water for, for example, irrigation. The extracted water could also be used as drinking water after suitable treatment.

Depending on the environmental legislation in the country, controls may be placed on extraction to limit the amount of water that can be removed. The over-extraction of water can lead to dry rivers or declining groundwater levels.

The science of hydrogeology is used to determine safe water extraction levels. Water can go through dams that are used to regulate or stop water from coming though, creating hydroelectricity.

Effects of overextraction

Saltwater intrusion

See also
 Atmospheric water generator
 Desalination
 Reclaimed water
 Groundwater extraction

References

Hydrology